Libuše Šafránková (7 June 1953 – 9 June 2021, married as Abrhámová) was a Czech actress. Her husband was actor Josef Abrhám.

Her breakthrough was the title role in the 1973 film Three Nuts for Cinderella, which is considered a Christmas film classic in many parts of Europe. In the 1970s and 1980s, she played leading roles in many fairy-tale films. Her later films include the Oscar-winning  Kolya (1996), for which she received the Czech Lion Award for Best Actress in a film in 1996. In 2008 she received the prize Hvězda mého srdce (Star of My Heart), awarded by Czech Television. She died two days after her 68th birthday.

Filmography 
 Babička (1971)
 Three Nuts for Cinderella (Tři oříšky pro Popelku) (1973)
 Přijela k nám pouť (1973)
 How to Drown Dr. M. or the End of Water Spirits in Bohemia (Jak utopit doktora Mráčka aneb Konec vodníků v Čechách) (1974)
 My Brother Has a Cute Brother (1975)
 Paleta lásky (1975)
 The Day That Shook the World (1975)
 The Little Mermaid (1976)
 Splynutí duší (1976)
 Brácha za všechny peníze (1978)
 The Prince and the Evening Star (Princ a Vecernice) (1978)
 Run Waiter Run! (Vrchní, prchni!) (1981)
 Křtiny (1981)
 The Third Prince (1982)
 The Salt Prince (1982)
 Svatební cesta do Jiljí (1983)
 Jára Cimrman Lying, Sleeping (Jára Cimrman ležící, spící) (1983)
 The Snowdrop Festival (1983)
 My Sweet Little Village (1985)
 Zuřivý reportér (1987)
 Člověk proti zkáze (1989)
 The Elementary School (Obecná škola) (1991)
 The Beggar's Opera (1991)
 The Necklace (1992)
 Královský život otroka (1992)
 Nesmrtelná teta (1993)
 Arabela se vrací (1993) 
 Kolya (1996)
 Wonderful Years That Sucked (1997)
 All My Loved Ones (1999)
 Which Side Eden (1999)
 Elixir a Halibela (2001)
 Četnické humoresky (2003)
 Fišpánská Jablíčka (2008)
 Micimutr (2011)
 The Don Juans (2013)

References

External links 
 
 Interview with Libuše Šafránková (Lidové noviny) 
 Interview with Libuše Šafránková (Mladá fronta DNES) 

1953 births
2021 deaths
Czech film actresses
Czech television actresses
Actors from Brno
20th-century Czech actresses
21st-century Czech actresses
Recipients of Medal of Merit (Czech Republic)
Czech Lion Awards winners
Brno Conservatory alumni
People from Šlapanice
Czech stage actresses